Mulavoor  is a village under Paipra grama panchayath in Muvattupuzha in Ernakulam district in the Indian state of Kerala. It is a semi urban area in Muvattupuzha town. Mulavoor village has many educational institutions like Ilahia engineering college, Ilahiya College of Management Studies, Govt U.P. School Mulavoor, MSM U.P School etc.
The village have many business organisation like KNS Timbers Mulavoor, marangattu cashews, mulattu cashews etc. 
Mulavoor chandanakkudam, Ulsavam of Arecadu Bhagavathi temple are the festivals of Mulavoor.

Demographics 

According to the 2011 census of India, the Mulavoor village has 7915 households. The literacy rate of the village is 82.94%.

References

Villages in Ernakulam district